No, David! is a 1998 children's picture book written and illustrated by David Shannon and published by Scholastic Inc. It was named a Caldecott Honor Book, an ALA Notable Children's Book, a Bulletin of the Center for Children's Books Blue Ribbon title, and a School Library Journal Best Book of the Year, and was on the New York Times Best Illustrated Book list.

Background
When author David Shannon was 5 years old, he wrote a story about a little six-year-old boy (named David) doing all sorts of things he was not supposed to do. "No" and "David" were the only words that appeared throughout the book, as they were the only words Shannon knew how to spell at that age. In 1997, Shannon came across his childhood book in his mother's closet and re-wrote it using a childlike handwriting and including drawings of his mishaps. In 1999, No, David was a Caldecott Honor Book. In the author's note, the author states, "Of course, 'yes' is a wonderful word. But 'yes' doesn't keep the crayon off the wall."

Sequels (Original Books)
David Goes to School (1999)
David Gets in Trouble (2002)
It's Christmas, David! (2010)
Grow Up, David! (2018)

Prequels (Board Books)
David Smells! (2005)
Oh, David! (2005)
Oops! (2005)

Sequels (Sticker and Activity Books)
Uh-oh, David! (2013)

Critical reception
In 1999, No, David! won the Caldecott Honor distinction.

Based on a 2007 online poll, the National Education Association listed the book as one of its "Teachers' Top 100 Books for Children." It was one of the "Top 100 Picture Books" of all time in a 2012 poll by School Library Journal.

References

1998 children's books
American picture books
Caldecott Honor-winning works